Just Another Way to Say I Love You is the self-produced fourth album by American R&B singer Barry White, released in 1975 on the 20th Century label.

History
The album topped the R&B albums chart, White's fourth in a row to do so, and peaked at #17 on the Billboard 200. It also reached #12 on the UK Albums Chart. The album was a success, yielding two Billboard R&B Top Ten singles, "What Am I Gonna Do with You", which peaked at #1, and "I'll Do for You Anything You Want Me To". Both were also successful on the Billboard Hot 100, peaking at #8 and #40 respectively. Both singles were also hits on the UK Singles Chart, peaking at #5 and #20 respectively. The album was digitally remastered and reissued on CD on July 31, 2006 by UMVD Special Markets.

Track listing

Personnel
Barry White - lead vocals, arranger
Gene Page - conductor
Technical
Frank Kejmar - engineer
Eddie Douglas, Jack Levy - art direction, design

Charts

Weekly charts

Year-end charts

Singles

Certifications and sales

See also
List of number-one R&B albums of 1975 (U.S.)

References

External links
 Just Another Way to Say I Love You at Discogs

Barry White albums
1975 albums
20th Century Fox Records albums